The Committee of Concerned Journalists (CCJ) was a U.S. non-profit consortium of journalists, publishers, media owners, academics and citizens worried about the future of the profession. CCJ was dissolved in December 2011.

To secure journalism's future, the group believes that journalists from all media, geography, rank and generation must be clear about what sets journalism apart from other endeavors. To accomplish this, the group has been creating a national conversation among journalists about principles. The group convened a series of forums in the late 1990s and has offered on-site training to print, broadcast and on-line news organizations through its Traveling Curriculum since 2001. By 2006, the group had offered 1½-day sessions to more than 7,300 journalists in more than 120 print, broadcast and on-line newsrooms.

The committee was founded by longtime journalist and former Nieman Foundation curator Bill Kovach and Tom Rosenstiel, the director of the Project for Excellence in Journalism.

Founded in 1997, CCJ was formerly affiliated with the Columbia School of Journalism. In 2006, it separated from Columbia University and became affiliated with the Missouri School of Journalism and its new Donald W. Reynolds Journalism Institute. CCJ was funded by the John S. and James L. Knight Foundation, a private, American non-profit foundation dedicated to promoting and improving journalism.

Sources
Knight Foundation Newsroom Training Initiative

2006 Missouri Honor Medal Recipients

Knight Foundation Awards $2.28 Million Grant to School and Committee of Concerned Journalists

References

External links
 The Committee of Concerned Journalists
 Traveling Curriculum

Professional associations based in the United States
Journalism in the Americas